The Juno Awards of 1979, representing Canadian music industry achievements of the previous year, were awarded on 21 March 1979 in Toronto at a ceremony hosted by Burton Cummings at the Harbour Castle Hilton Convention Centre.

Claudja Barry and Ginette Reno were live performers on the ceremony telecast, seen on CBC Television from 9:30pm Eastern Time. Gino Vannelli and Chilliwack provided videotaped performances.

Pierre Trudeau attended the ceremonies, the first time a Canadian Prime Minister did so. He introduced Hank Snow into the Canadian Music Hall of Fame.

Cummings and Dan Hill led nominations with four each.  In an unusual move, Hill was nominated in the "Composer of the Year" category for "Sometimes When We Touch" for the second time as it had sold more than 75,000 copies after the first award at the 1978 Juno ceremony.

This was the first year when Gordon Lightfoot failed to pick up an award, and Anne Murray was not present to claim her two awards.  The CBC television broadcast was seen by an estimated 1,827,000 viewers which was down from the year before.

Nominees and winners

Female Vocalist of the Year
Winner: Anne Murray

Other nominees:
Carroll Baker
Lisa Dal Bello
Patsy Gallant
Joni Mitchell

Male Vocalist of the Year
Winner: Gino Vannelli

Other nominees:
Burton Cummings
Dan Hill
Gordon Lightfoot
Neil Young

Most Promising Female Vocalist of the Year
Winner: Claudja Barry

Other nominees:
Ronney Abramson
Carolyne Bernier
Roxanne Goldade
Denise McCann

Most Promising Male Vocalist of the Year
Winner: Nick Gilder

Other nominees:
Rick James
Marc Jordan
Martin Stevens
Pat Travers

Group of the Year
Winner: Rush

Other nominees:
Chilliwack
Prism
Triumph
Trooper

Most Promising Group of the Year
Winner: Doucette

Other nominees:
Max Webster
Streetheart
Teaze
Zon

Composer of the Year
Winner: Dan Hill (Co-composer with Barry Mann), "Sometimes When We Touch" by Dan Hill

Other nominees:
Burton Cummings, "Break It to Them Gently" by Burton Cummings
Nick Gilder & James McCulloch, "Hot Child in the City" by Nick Gilder
Frank Mills, "Music Box Dancer" by Frank Mills
Brian Smith & Ra McGuire, "Raise a Little Hell" by Trooper

Country Female Vocalist of the Year
Winner: Carroll Baker

Country Male Vocalist of the Year
Winner: Ronnie Prophet

Country Group or Duo of the Year
Winner: The Good Brothers

Folk Singer of the Year
Winner: Murray McLauchlan

Other nominees:
Bruce Cockburn
Dan Hill
Gordon Lightfoot
Valdy

Instrumental Artist of the Year
Winner: Liona Boyd

Other nominees:
André Gagnon
Hagood Hardy
Frank Mills
Black Light Orchestra

Producer of the Year
Winner: Gino Vannelli, Joe Vannelli & Ross Vannelli, Brother to Brother by Gino Vannelli

Other nominees:
Matthew McCauley & Fred Mollin, Frozen in the Night by Dan Hill & McCluskey by David McCluskey
Jack Richardson, Richard T. Bear by Richard T. Bear
Terry Brown &  Rush, Hemispheres by Rush
Bob Segarini, Gotta Have Pop by Bob Segarini

Recording Engineer of the Year
Winner: Ken Friesen, Let's Keep It That Way by Anne Murray

Other nominees:
Rick Capreol & Jeff Smith, Special Way by Aura
David Greene, Unexplored Territory by Canadian Brass
Andrew Hermant, Frozen in the Night by Dan Hill
Mike Jones, The Cooper Brothers by The Cooper Brothers

Canadian Music Hall of Fame
Winner: Hank Snow

Nominated and winning albums

Best Selling Album
Winner: Dream of a Child, Burton Cummings

Other nominees:
Carroll Baker, 20 Country Classics
Gordon Lightfoot, Endless Wire
Trooper, Thick as Thieves
Rush, Hemispheres

Best Album Graphics
Winner: Alan Gee & Greg Lawson, Madcats by Madcats

Other nominees:
James Hill, The Candelight & Wine Album compilation by CHFI 98.1
James O'Mara, See Forever Eyes by Prism
Bob Kroll, Unexplored Territory by Canadian Brass
William Roberto Wilson, Maneige by Maneige
Myron Zabol & Gary Muth, Meanwhile Back in Paris by Streetheart

Best Children's Album
Winner: There's a Hippo in My Tub, Anne Murray

Best Classical Album of the Year
Winner: Hindemith; Das Marienleben, Glenn Gould and Roxolana Roslak

Best Selling International Album
Winner: Saturday Night Fever, Bee Gees

Best Jazz Album
Winner: Jazz Canada Montreux 1978, Tommy Banks Big Band with Guest "Big" Miller
Big Band Jazz, Vol. II — Humber College Jazz Ensemble
Things Are Looking Up — Moe Koffman
Bones Blues — Pete Magadini
More Than Ever — Ted Moses

Comedy Album of the Year
Winner: The Air Farce Comedy Album, The Air Farce
Other nominees:
Alden Diehl, Fight On
Nestor Pistor, Best of Nestor Pistor
Nestor Pistor, Nestor Pistor for Prime Minister
Nancy White, Civil Service Songwriter

Nominated and winning releases

Best Selling Single
Winner: "Hot Child in the City", Nick Gilder
 Burton Cummings, "Break It to Them Gently" 
 Dan Hill, "Sometimes When We Touch"
 Anne Murray, "You Needed Me"
 Martin Stevens, "Love Is in the Air"

Best Selling International Single
Winner: "You're the One That I Want", John Travolta & Olivia Newton-John

References

Bibliography
 LeBlanc, Larry. (2010). Music from far and wide: Celebrating 40 years of the Juno Awards. Key Porter Books Limited, Toronto.

External links
Juno Awards site

1979
1979 music awards
1979 in Canadian music